Chinmaya Vidyalaya, Nauni is an English Medium co-ed school in Solan, Himachal Pradesh. Established in 1983, the school teaches students from nursery to twelfth standard.

The school is affiliated with CBSE board and houses students from various ethnicities, cultures and national backgrounds.

The school was established in 1983.

Houses 
The school has four houses named after philosophers and educational leaders. These are:
 Tagore (Blue)
 Gandhi (Green)
 Vivekanand (Yellow)
 Raman (Red)

The purpose of these houses is to facilitate competition between students. Throughout the year, there are numerous competitions such as Sports, Quiz, Debate, Declamation, Dance and so on. There is a set criterion to allot marks to the houses on the basis of their performance in the competitions. Students who are good academic achievers also add on a certain number of marks to their respective house. The marks are totaled towards the end of every month and house of the month is honored thereafter. At the end of the session house of the year is awarded a trophy.

Sports 
Students take part in tournaments on intra and inter school level.

Motto 
The motto of the school is "keep smiling".

References 

Chief Minister Virbhadra Singh at Chinmaya Vidyalaya Nauni - Tribune India

External links

Boarding schools in Himachal Pradesh
Education in Shimla
Schools in Shimla district
Schools affiliated with the Chinmaya Mission